The Durgin House is a historic house in Reading, Massachusetts.  Built in 1872 by Boston businessman William Durgin, this -story wood-frame house is one of the finest Italianate houses in the town.  It follows a cross-gable plan, with a pair of small side porches and bay windows on the main gable ends.  The porches are supported by chamfered posts on pedestals, and feature roof lines with a denticulated cornice and brackets.  The main roof line also features paired decorative brackets.  There are round-headed windows in the gable ends.

The house was listed on the National Register of Historic Places in 1984.

See also
National Register of Historic Places listings in Reading, Massachusetts
National Register of Historic Places listings in Middlesex County, Massachusetts

References

Houses completed in 1872
Houses on the National Register of Historic Places in Reading, Massachusetts
Houses in Reading, Massachusetts
1872 establishments in Massachusetts